Danilo “Dača” Ikodinović (born 4 October 1976) is a Serbian former professional water polo player who played on the bronze medal squad at the 2000 Summer Olympics (with Yugoslavia) and the silver medal squad at the 2004 Summer Olympics (with Serbia and Montenegro). He received a Golden Badge, award for the best athlete in Serbia and Montenegro.

Club career
He spent the 2005/06 season playing for VK Partizan. He appeared for the Serbian national water polo team in 304 matches, scoring 299 goals. In 2006, he appeared as a model in an underwear campaign for ExtremeIntimo. During the summer of 2006 he signed for Russian club Sintez Kazan. In his first season in Sintez Kazan, Ikodinović led the team to 2006/07 LEN Cup trophy as well as the Russian league title. In late March 2008, he reached an agreement with PVK Jadran to play for them in 2008/09 season.

Clubs he played for
 1992–1998 VK Partizan
 1998–1999 ASN Catania
 1999–2001 AN Brescia
 2001–2005 Pro Recco
 2005–2006 VK Partizan
 2006–2008 Sintez
 2008–2009 PVK Jadran

Honours

Club
VK Partizan
 National Championship of Yugoslavia (1): 1994–95
 National Cup of Yugoslavia (3): 1992–93, 1993–94, 1994–95
 LEN Cup (1): 1997–98
Pro Recco
 Serie A1 (1): 2001–02
 Trofeo del Giocatore (1): 2003
 LEN Euroleague (1): 2002–03
 LEN Supercup (1): 2004
Sintez Kazan
 National Championship of Russia (1): 2006–07
 LEN Cup (1): 2006–07

Individual
 LEN Euroleague Final Four MVP (1): 2003 Genova
 Golden Badge (1): 2005

Politics 
Ikodinović endorsed the Serbian Progressive Party (SNS) for the 2018 Belgrade City Assembly election, however, later he became a strong critic of SNS and its leader Aleksandar Vučić. On 17 March 2021, Ikodinović joined the People's Party (NS) and became the president of its Sports Committee.

Personal
In 2000, Ikodinović married his girlfriend Anja who later that year gave birth to their daughter Andrea. The couple divorced in 2003.

For a few months during 2004, he dated professional karate fighter Snežana Perić. The relationship was high-profile with coverage in Serbian tabloids and lifestyle magazines.

Later that year Ikodinović began a relationship with Serbian pop singer Nataša Bekvalac. Once the relationship became public on New Year's 2005 it inspired even more press coverage. In July 2006 the couple married in Sremski Karlovci. They have a daughter named Hana who was born in March 2007 while Danilo was playing at the World Championships in Melbourne. The couple divorced in January 2011.

Motorcycle accident
On Friday, 27 June 2008, around 8:20pm, Ikodinović was involved in a traffic accident while riding his Yamaha R1 motorcycle on the Zrenjanin-Novi Sad regional road near the town of Kać. The thirty-one-year-old professional water polo player was transferred to intensive care in Novi Sad where he got immediately taken in for surgery that ended up lasting almost eight hours. As a result, his condition was stabilized, but remained critical. Reportedly, of the numerous injuries he sustained, the heaviest trauma occurred on his right arm with severe tearing of blood vessels (nerves and arteries).

The next day, in the evening hours of 28 June 2008, almost twenty four hours following the accident, he underwent another vascular surgery on his arm. His condition has since improved.

Investigation of the crash finished by mid November 2008, determining that Ikodinović had been driving at a speed of 173 km/h while having blood alcohol content of over 2 per mil (considered to be the medium level of alcoholic intoxication) when he rear-ended the Yugo driven by Pajica Dejanović that had just begun overtaking a tractor vehicle driven by Miroslav Kukić.

Ikodinović was charged with violating traffic safety. His case went before a judge in Novi Sad Municipal Court on 5 March 2009 where he was found guilty of causing the accident and got ordered to pay RSD70,000 (around €760 according to the exchange rate at the time). He also received an eight-month ban on driving a motorcycle. District public persecutor submitted an appeal on the court's decision due to not being satisfied with the amount of the fine.

The damages part of the case was settled out of court on 26 May 2009, which is when Ikodinović paid a sum to Pajica Dejanović that was in some media outlets reported to be €6,000.

See also
 List of Olympic medalists in water polo (men)
 List of world champions in men's water polo
 List of World Aquatics Championships medalists in water polo

References

 Serbian Olympic Committee

External links
 

1976 births
Living people
Serbian male water polo players
Serbia and Montenegro male water polo players
Yugoslav male water polo players
Water polo players at the 2000 Summer Olympics
Water polo players at the 2004 Summer Olympics
Olympic water polo players of Yugoslavia
Olympic water polo players of Serbia and Montenegro
Olympic bronze medalists for Federal Republic of Yugoslavia
Olympic silver medalists for Serbia and Montenegro
Sportspeople from Belgrade
Olympic medalists in water polo
Medalists at the 2004 Summer Olympics
World Aquatics Championships medalists in water polo
Medalists at the 2000 Summer Olympics
European champions for Serbia
Mediterranean Games gold medalists for Yugoslavia
Competitors at the 1997 Mediterranean Games
Mediterranean Games medalists in water polo